Dieter Stier (born 29 June 1964) is a German politician. Born in Weißenfels, Saxony-Anhalt, he represents the CDU. Dieter Stier has served as a member of the Bundestag from the state of Saxony-Anhalt since 2009.

Life 
He became member of the bundestag after the 2009 German federal election. He is a member of the Committee for Food and Agriculture and the Sports Committee.

References

External links 

  
 Bundestag biography 

1964 births
Living people
Members of the Bundestag for Saxony-Anhalt
Members of the Bundestag 2021–2025
Members of the Bundestag 2017–2021
Members of the Bundestag 2013–2017
Members of the Bundestag 2009–2013
Members of the Bundestag for the Christian Democratic Union of Germany